Conan the Barbarian is a comics book title starring the sword-and-sorcery character created by Robert E. Howard, published by the American company Marvel Comics. It debuted with a first issue cover-dated October 1970 and ran for 275 issues until 1993. A commercial success, the title launched a sword-and-sorcery vogue in American 1970s comics.

Marvel Comics reacquired the publishing rights in 2018 and started a new run of Conan the Barbarian in January 2019 with the creative team of writer Jason Aaron and artist Mahmud A. Asrar.

Publication history 
Conan the Barbarian ran for 275 issues (cover dated October 1970–December 1993). The book had a single writer, Roy Thomas, on issues #1–115 (October 1970–October 1980) and then #240–275 (January 1991–December 1993). It was also the signature work of artist Barry Smith, who pencilled most issues between #1 and #24. Artist John Buscema pencilled the vast bulk of issues #25–190. Interim writers included J. M. DeMatteis, Bruce Jones, Michael Fleisher, Doug Moench, Jim Owsley, Alan Zelenetz, Chuck Dixon, and Don Kraar.

Thomas, Marvel's associate editor at the time, had obtained the licensed property from the estate of its creator, Robert E. Howard, after finding Conan chief among readers' requests for literary properties to be adapted to comics, which also included the pulp magazine character Doc Savage, The Lord of the Rings oeuvre of writer J. R. R. Tolkien, and Edgar Rice Burroughs' characters Tarzan and John Carter of Mars. Elaborating in 2010, he said, 

Thomas said another reason for pursuing Thongor was that Marvel editor-in-chief Stan Lee "liked that name the most. . . . I soon got stalled by Lin Carter's agent on Thongor . . . and I got a sudden impulse to go after Conan. Later, following on the success of the Conan series, Lin Carter allowed Marvel to publish a Thongor comic, which appeared as a miniseries in Creatures on the Loose."

After reading and enjoying the paperback Conan of Cimmeria, Thomas contacted Glen Lord, literary agent for the Howard estate, and "I said we can't offer much money but it might increase Conan's audience and so forth, what do you think? I didn't have much elasticity, but I was so embarrassed by the $150 that I upped it to $200 without thinking. So that when Glen agreed ... I decided I'd have to write the first issue or so, so that if Goodman objected I could knock a couple pages off my rate to even things out."

The extra cost meant, however, that Marvel could not budget for Buscema, Thomas' first choice, serendipitously opening the door to Smith. Buscema, in a 1994 interview, recalled,

Comics historian Les Daniels noted that "Conan the Barbarian was something of a gamble for Marvel. The series contained the usual elements of action and fantasy, to be sure, but it was set in a past that had no relation to the Marvel Universe, and it featured a hero who possessed no magical powers, little humor and comparatively few moral principles."

Marvel initially published Conan every two months. After sales of #1 were strong Marvel quickly made the title monthly, but sales dropped with each additional issue. Lee decided to cancel the comic with #7, not only because of the weak sales but to use Smith on more popular comics. Thomas argued against the decision and Lee relented, although the book became bimonthly again with #14. By #20 Conan again became monthly because of rising sales, and the comic became one of Marvel's most popular in the 1970s.

Elric of Melniboné first appeared in comics in Conan the Barbarian issues #14–15 (March–May 1972). The comics were written by Thomas and illustrated by Windsor-Smith, based on a story plotted by Michael Moorcock and James Cawthorn.  Red Sonja was introduced in issue #23 (February 1973).

In 2010, Comics Bulletin ranked Thomas' work on Conan the Barbarian with Smith and Buscema seventh on its list of the "Top 10 1970s Marvels".

Annuals and Giant-Size series 
Twelve issues of Conan Annual were published from 1973 to 1987. Giant-Size Conan was a series of 68 page giants which ran for five issues from September 1974 to 1975.

Awards 
Academy of Comic Book Arts Shazam Awards
 
1970
Best New Talent: Barry Smith

1971
Best Continuing Feature: Conan the Barbarian
Best Writer (Dramatic): Roy Thomas

1973
Best Individual Story (Dramatic): Song of Red Sonja from Conan the Barbarian #24 by Roy Thomas and Barry Smith

1974
Best Continuing Feature: Conan the Barbarian
Best Penciller (Dramatic): John Buscema
Superior Achievement by an Individual: Roy Thomas

Collected editions 
 Essential Conan collects Conan the Barbarian #1–25, 530 pages, July 2000, Marvel Comics, 
 Dark Horse Comics published the Chronicles of Conan series, which comprises 34 volumes released between 2003 and 2017 that collects most of the series and all of the annuals.
 The Barry Windsor-Smith Conan Archives
 Volume 1 collects Conan the Barbarian #1–11, 200 pages, February 2010, Dark Horse Comics, 
 Volume 2 collects Conan the Barbarian #12–16 and #19–24, 288 pages, May 2010, Dark Horse Comics, 
 Conan the Barbarian: The Original Marvel Years Omnibus
 Volume 1 collects Conan the Barbarian #1–26 plus additional material,  776 pages, January 2019, Marvel Comics, 
 Volume 2 collects Conan the Barbarian #27–51 plus additional material,  856 pages, August 2019, Marvel Comics, 
 Volume 3 collects Conan the Barbarian #52–83 plus additional material,  832 pages, January 2020, Marvel Comics, 
 Volume 4 collects Conan the Barbarian #84–115 plus additional material,  848 pages, October 2020, Marvel Comics, 
 Volume 5 collects Conan the Barbarian #116–149 plus additional material,  1048 pages, March 2021, Marvel Comics, 
 Volume 6 collects Conan the Barbarian #150–171 plus additional material,  672 pages, November 2021, Marvel Comics, 
 Volume 7 collects Conan the Barbarian #172–194 plus additional material,  680 pages, January 2022, Marvel Comics, 
 Volume 8 collects Conan the Barbarian #195–213 plus additional material,  624 pages, June 2022, Marvel Comics, 
 Volume 9 collects Conan the Barbarian #214–240 plus additional material,  704 pages, October 2022, Marvel Comics, 
 Volume 10 collects Conan the Barbarian #241–275 plus additional material,  944 pages, December 2022, Marvel Comics,

See also 
 Conan (comics)
 Conan (Marvel Comics)

References

External links

1970 comics debuts
1993 comics endings
Comics based on works by Robert E. Howard
Comics by Doug Moench
Comics by J. M. DeMatteis
Comics by Michael Fleisher
Comics by Neal Adams
Comics by Roy Thomas
Conan the Barbarian comics
Fantasy comics
Marvel Comics titles